FINEOS is a public company Dublin-based software development company, which was founded in 1993. FINEOS is a provider of enterprise software for insurance, and government social insurance. The company is headquartered in Dublin, Ireland and has offices in North America, Europe, Australia and New Zealand.

References 

Software companies of Ireland
Companies established in 1993